Scooby-Doo! Camp Scare is a 2010 direct-to-DVD animated comedy horror-mystery film; the fifteenth direct-to-video film based upon the Scooby-Doo Saturday morning cartoon, and was released on September 14, 2010. The film was released seven months after the release of Scooby-Doo! Abracadabra-Doo.  The 15th direct-to-video Scooby-Doo film, the film sold 53,389 units in its first week and as of January 2013, it has sold approximately 194,000 units.

Plot

Scooby-Doo and the gang travel to Camp Little Moose, Fred's old summer camp, to vacation and serve as camp counselors. However, on arrival, they find the camp empty, except for Burt, the head counselor, and the local Forest Ranger, Ranger Knudsen. They discover that one of the camp's old legends, the Woodsman, a cruel, abusive counselor who went insane after a prank set up by his campers went awry and left him with severe brain trauma, has come to life and scared the kids away. Ranger Knudsen suggests Burt close the camp before leaving. Burt is about to listen to the Ranger's advice when three kids, Luke, Trudy, and Deacon, arrive at the camp. Fred convinces Burt to keep the camp open until the Mystery Inc. gang discovers what is going on. But the gang and the kids are soon attacked by the Woodsman.

The next day, everyone decides to spend the day at Big Moose Lake, home of the rich and modern Camp Big Moose. While enjoying their time at the lake, they are attacked by the Fishman, another camp legend about a lonely kid who spent so much time swimming in the lake, which caused him to evolve into a half-man half-fish monster, that has also come to life. During the chase, Scooby-Doo discovers a building at the bottom of Big Moose Lake.

That night, Jessica, Camp Big Moose's head counselor, asks the gang if Camp Little Moose is pulling a prank on Camp Big Moose, explaining that an RV and some sonar equipment are missing from the camp. The gang wonders what purpose the equipment would serve for the Woodsman or the Fishman. Velma uses the RV's tracking device to locate it to Shadow Canyon, where (as Burt explains) the Spectre, another camp legend about a lost hiker whose vengeful spirit is still looking for a way out of the canyon, killing anyone who hears her scream, resides. Everyone splits up; Fred, Daphne, Jessica, and Luke go investigate the building under Big Moose Lake, and Velma, Shaggy, Scooby, Burt, Trudy, and Deacon head to Shadow Canyon. After being chased by the Fishman, Fred and the others discover a whole town under the lake, as well as some dynamite hidden in a cavern. Velma and the company discover the missing RV and sonar equipment in Shadow Canyon and find that the sonar equipment is being used to scan the lake. Then, they are chased away by the Spectre.

Everyone meets back at Camp Little Moose to go over what they found. Deacon decides he has had enough and wants to go back to Camp Big Moose, and Jessica drives him. The Mystery Inc. gang decides to ask a local shop owner about the underwater town. He explains that it was a mining town called Moose Creek, that was forced to be evacuated to create the dam and Big Moose Lake. More importantly, the treasure of a notorious gangster named Ricky LaRue is said to still be buried there. Before his death, the gangster had told his cellmate, Babyface Boretti, that when the sun hits the town steeple on the Summer Solstice, the location of the treasure would be revealed. Boretti himself escaped prison two months before the gang arrived at camp. The gang reasons that the dynamite will be used to destroy the dam and reveal Moose Creek for the monsters to find the treasure, as the next day is the Summer Solstice. But doing this would flood Camp Little Moose. The gang returns to the camp to find that the Woodsman has laid waste to it, but Burt, Luke, and Trudy are safe. The gang realizes that if the Woodsman found the camp unoccupied, he would be free to destroy the dam. The dam is then blown apart, and everyone narrowly escapes the resulting flash flood.

The gang goes to Moose Creek, now exposed, to explore. There they find Jessica, who explains she was following Deacon. They are then attacked by the Woodsman, who chases Fred, Jessica, and Luke. The rest are found by Deacon, who, after locking them up, reveals that he is Babyface Boretti, and is looking for the treasure. The Woodsman chases Fred and the others up the bell tower, but he is soon knocked out the window. The Fishman appears later, but Scooby knocks it through a wall with the Mystery Machine. They unmask it again and it turns out to be Ranger Knudsen, who posed as the Woodsman, the Fishman, and the Spectre. The gang also captures Babyface Boretti, who tries to escape with the treasure. Velma explains that Boretti and Knudsen teamed up to scare away the kids at Camp Little Moose, explode the dam, and take the treasure. When the Mystery gang arrived, Boretti posed as Deacon to try to convince everyone to leave and the two used the sonar equipment to search for the town under the lake, all while utilizing the disguises to scare away the campers and anyone near the lake. They also figured that the Spectre used a zipline to fly through the canyon. In the end, Boretti and Knudsen are arrested; Burt and Jessica merge the camps to form Camp Little Big Moose at Moose Creek, and the Mystery Inc. gang serves the remainder of the summer as camp counselors. In a post-credits scene, it is revealed that the Spectre is haunting the camp, and was not a disguise.

Voice cast
 Frank Welker as Scooby-Doo and Fred Jones
 Matthew Lillard as Shaggy Rogers
 Mindy Cohn as Velma Dinkley
 Grey DeLisle as Daphne Blake
 Scott Menville as Luke
 Tara Strong as Trudy
 Stephen Root as Burt
 Lauren Tom as Jessica
 Mark Hamill as Deacon/Babyface Boretti and Store Owner
 Dee Bradley Baker as Ranger Knudsen, Woodsman, Fishman, and Spectre
 Phil LaMarr as Darrel

EP
An EP soundtrack for the film was released exclusively to iTunes Stores in the U.S. on September 14, 2010.
"Here Comes Summer" - Just for Laughs - 2:15
"Perfect World" - Just for Laughs - 2:37
"Summertime" - Sussana Benn - 2:30

References

External links

 
 
 

Scooby-Doo direct-to-video animated films
2010 animated films
2010 films
2010 direct-to-video films
Warner Bros. direct-to-video animated films
American television films
2010s American animated films
Films directed by Ethan Spaulding
Films about summer camps
American children's animated comedy films
2010s children's animated films
American children's animated mystery films
2010s English-language films